The Best of Deep Purple: Live in Europe is a 2003 album by English rock band Deep Purple. It contains several re-released and unreleased live Deep Purple songs from the Mark II, III and VII lineups.

Track listing
 "Smoke on the Water" (Mk. VII)
 "Stormbringer" (Mk. III)
 "Gypsy" (Mk. III)
 "Burn" (Mk. III)
 "Never Before" (Mk. II)
 "Highway Star" (Mk. II)
 "Strange Kind of Woman" (Mk. II)
 "Into the Fire" (Mk. II)
 "Speed King" (Mk. II)
 "Child in Time" (Mk. II)
 "Lucille" (Mk. II)
 "Black Night" (Mk. II)

Lineups
Mk. II: Ian Gillan, Ritchie Blackmore, Jon Lord, Roger Glover, Ian Paice

Mk. III: David Coverdale, Ritchie Blackmore, Jon Lord, Glenn Hughes, Ian Paice

Mk. VII: Ian Gillan, Steve Morse, Jon Lord, Roger Glover, Ian Paice

2003 live albums
Deep Purple live albums